Raminta Šerkšnytė (born 1975) is a Lithuanian composer, pianist and Lithuanian National Prize for Culture and Arts laureate.

Life and career
Šerkšnytė was born in Kaunas, Lithuania. From 1982 to 1994, she studied music at Kaunas J. Naujalio high school and with her aunt, Rymantė Šerkšnytė. From 1994 to 2000, she studied composition at the Lithuanian Academy of Music with Osvaldas Balakauskas. From 1997 to 2007, she studied composition abroad. After completing her studies, she worked as a pianist and composer. Her music has been performed internationally in Berlin, New York, Toronto, Moscow and at a number of international music festivals.

Awards
1995 – Juozas Gruodis Composers Competition, first prize for the song Misterioso for two flutes and bass
2003 and 2006 – Lithuanian Composers' Union, twice awarded the prize for the best chamber work (2003 for Oriental Elegy for string quartet, 2006 for Almond Blossom for chamber ensemble) 
2005 – Gold Cross of the Scene as the best theater composer 
2005 – Lithuanian Ministry of Culture Prize for young artists 
2005 – UNESCO 's International Rostrum of Composers for "Vortex" for solo violin and ensemble
2007 – Muses Mill Prize
2008 – Lithuanian National Prize for Culture and Arts for classical music and modern forms

Works
Šerkšnytė's works include:

Orchestra
 De profundis, 1998
 Aisbergas, 2000
 Koncertas, 2002
 Kalnai migloje, 2005
 Mažojo princo pasaka, 2007
 Žara, 2008
 This too shall pass, for violin, cello, vibraphone and string orchestra, 2021

Solo instrument
 Pasakalija, 1995
 Fantazija, 1997
 Adagio, 1999
 Adieu, 2002
 Miražas, 2003
 Trys ostinato preliudai, 2007

Chamber
 Styginių kvartetas, 1994
 Misterioso, 1994
 Trys koncertinės pjesės, 1995
 Vizijos, 1995
 Žvelgiant į pasąmonę (Looking at the Subconscious) for flute and viola (1997)
 Koncertas šešiems, 1999
 Basso ostinato, 2001
 Rytų elegija, 2002
 Idée fixe, 2002
 Nuojautos (Presentiments) for flute, viola and 1~4 prepared pianos (2002)
 Sūkurys, 2004
 Miražai, 2005
 Migdolų žydėjimas, 2006

Vocal
 Saula, 2004
 Sense Six, 2004

Choral
 Aurei Regina Caeli, 1996
 Saulėlydžio ir aušros giesmės, 2007
 Sakura, 2018

For children
 Supasi lapai nubudinti, 1995
 Andante, 1997
 Vakaro atspindžiai, 1997
 Mažasis preliudas, 1998
 Baladė, 1998
 Šaltinėlis, 1998
 Dvi invencijos, 2003

References

External links
 
 

1975 births
20th-century classical composers
20th-century classical pianists
20th-century women composers
21st-century classical composers
21st-century classical pianists
21st-century women composers
Lithuanian classical composers
Lithuanian classical pianists
Lithuanian women pianists
Living people
Musicians from Kaunas
Women classical composers
Women classical pianists
20th-century women pianists
21st-century women pianists